The AFC Women's Asian Cup (formerly known as the AFC Women's Championship) is a quadrennial competition in women's football for national teams which belong to the Asian Football Confederation (AFC). It is the oldest women's international football competition and  premier women's football competition in the AFC region for national teams. The competition is also known as the Asian Women's Football Championship and the Asian Women's Championship. 20 tournaments have been held, with the current champions being China PR. The competition also serves as Asian  qualifying tournament for the FIFA Women's World Cup.

History

The competition was set up by the Asian Ladies Football Confederation (ALFC), a part of the AFC responsible for women's football. The first competition was held in 1975 and was held every two years after this, except for a period in the 1980s where the competition was held every three years. The ALFC was initially a separate organisation but was absorbed into the AFC in 1986.

From 1975 to 1981, matches were 60 minutes in duration.

The competition has been dominated by countries from the Pacific Rim or Eastern Asia (including East and Southeast Asia), with the China women's national football team having won 9 times, including a series of 7 consecutive victories as of 2022 edition. Countries from Central and West Asia have been rather less successful, with only Uzbekistan, Kazakhstan, Jordan and Iran having qualified so far. Eastern Asia has also been far more frequent in participating in the FIFA Women's World Cup, with five strongest women's teams of Asia (China, North Korea, Japan, Australia and South Korea) hail from this part.

The tournament frequency changed to every 4 years effective from 2010, after AFC had announced that the Asian Cup will additionally serve as the qualification rounds of the 2015 FIFA Women's World Cup.

Until 2003, teams were invited by the AFC to compete. From 2006, a separate qualification was established and the number of teams will be decided by the merit by qualification process. The name of the tournament was also changed to as the "AFC Women's Asian Cup", to reflect the change and reforms of the competition.

The tournament was expanded from eight teams to twelve starting from the 2022 edition.

Qualification

Format
All of the 47 members of the AFC who have a women's national team are eligible to participate in the qualification tournament.

Starting from 2022 edition, a total of twelve teams participate in the final tournament including the hosts, top three finishers of the previous edition and eight teams from the qualification tournament.

Results

Notes

Performance by nation

Participating nations

Notes:

Summary (1975-2022)

Awards

Winning coaches

See also
AFF Women's Championship
CAFA Women's Championship
EAFF E-1 Football Championship (women)
SAFF Women's Championship
WAFF Women's Championship
AFC Asian Cup

References

External links
Official website
Tournament history at RSSSF

Further reading

 
Asian Football Confederation competitions for women's national teams
Asian championships
Recurring sporting events established in 1975
Association football events